LHH or lhh may refer to:

 Lawyers Have Heart, annual fundraising event for the greater Washington D.C. region affiliate of the American Heart Association
 Lenox Hill Hospital, a hospital in the Upper East Side of Manhattan, New York City
 lhh, the ISO 639-3 code for Laha language (Indonesia), Ambon Island, Indonesia